Liceo Leonardo da Vinci may refer to:

In Italy:
 Liceo Scientifico Leonardo da Vinci in Casalecchio di Reno
 Liceo Scientifico Statale Leonardo da Vinci in Milan
 Liceo Scientifico Statale "Leonardo da Vinci" di Reggio Calabria
 Liceo Scientifico Statale Leonardo da Vinci di Treviso
 Liceo Scientifico Statale Leonardo da Vinci di Firenze
 Liceo Da Vinci Jesi
 Liceo Leonardo da Vinci di Arzignano
 Liceo Leonardo Da Vinci - Pescara
 Liceo Scientifico "Leonardo da Vinci" di Maglie
 Liceo Scientifico Statale Leonardo da Vinci di Genova

Outside of Italy:
 Istituto Statale Italiano Leonardo Da Vinci in Paris, France